Liu Feiliang (born 27 March 1985) is a pole vaulter from Qingdao, China.

He won the bronze medal at the 2004 World Junior Championships. He also competed at the 2004 Olympic Games, the 2007 World Championships and the 2008 World Indoor Championships without reaching the final round.

His personal best jump is 5.71 metres, achieved in July 2007 in Guangzhou.

References

1985 births
Living people
Chinese male pole vaulters
Athletes (track and field) at the 2004 Summer Olympics
Athletes (track and field) at the 2008 Summer Olympics
Olympic athletes of China
Athletes from Qingdao